Donkey punch is a punch or cocktail made of one part rum, three parts orange juice, two parts ginger ale, one part pineapple juice, and grenadine syrup. The ingredients are poured into shaker filled with ice and shaken well before being poured into a large glass filled with ice cubes. The ingredients can also be mixed together in a punch bowl and served with ice and orange slices floating on top.

References 

Cocktails with rum
Tiki drinks
Cocktails with orange juice
Cocktails with pineapple juice
Cocktails with grenadine
Cocktails with ginger ale
Sweet cocktails
Bubbly cocktails